Vasily Vladimirovich Koshechkin (born 27 March 1983) is a Russian professional ice hockey goaltender. He currently plays for Metallurg Magnitogorsk in the Kontinental Hockey League.

Playing career 
Koshechkin started his professional hockey career as the backup goaltender of Lada Togliatti, RSL. He took over as number-one goaltender in 2005–06 season, playing 41 out of 51 regular season games. With 3 goals against and 1 shutout in 3 games, he also actively contributed into the latest international achievement of his team, 2005–06 Continental Cup win. He had spent three seasons in Severstal Cherepovets before he moved to Metallurg Magnitogorsk.

Although Koshechkin was drafted by the Tampa Bay Lightning in the 2002 NHL Entry Draft, Koshechkin has never left the KHL in his career.

International play

During the 2006–07 season, Koshechkin was invited to represent the Russian national team. Koshechkin was named a reserve player for the 2010 Winter Olympics, though he didn't play in the tournament. He was next invited to the 2010 IIHF World Championship. He was a member of the Olympic Athletes from Russia team at the 2018 Winter Olympics.

Career statistics

Regular season

International

References

External links
 

1983 births
Living people
Sportspeople from Tolyatti
Ak Bars Kazan players
HC Lada Togliatti players
Metallurg Magnitogorsk players
Severstal Cherepovets players
Russian ice hockey goaltenders
Tampa Bay Lightning draft picks
Ice hockey players at the 2018 Winter Olympics
Olympic ice hockey players of Russia
Medalists at the 2018 Winter Olympics
Olympic medalists in ice hockey
Olympic gold medalists for Olympic Athletes from Russia